Erina (written: 恵里奈, 恵里菜, 恵利奈, 絵里奈, 絵梨奈, 絵理奈, 衣梨奈, 衣理那, 依里奈 or えり菜) is a feminine Japanese given name. Notable people with the name include:

, Japanese tennis player
, Japanese badminton player
, Japanese singer and idol
, Japanese speed skater
, Japanese singer, idol and actress
, Japanese announcer
, Japanese artist
, Japanese voice actress
, Japanese actress
Erina Takahashi, English ballerina
, Japanese gravure idol
, Japanese women's footballer
, Japanese voice actress

Fictional characters
, a character in the light novel series Gonna be the Twin-Tail!!
, a character in the manga series Shokugeki no Sōma
, a supporting character in parts 1 and 2 of the manga series JoJo's Bizarre Adventure
Erina Kinjo Won, a character in the anime series Martian Successor Nadesico

Japanese feminine given names